Kirkpatrick–Reisch sorting is a fast sorting algorithm for items with limited-size integer keys. It is notable for having an asymptotic time complexity that is better than radix sort.

References 

Sorting algorithms